Patrick Finnigan  (born 1955) is a Canadian Liberal politician, who was elected to represent the riding of Miramichi—Grand Lake in the House of Commons of Canada in the 2015 federal election.

Finnigan and his wife started a bakery and garden centre in Rogersville, called Mr. Tomato. Finnigan holds a technical diploma in phytology.

He chaired the Standing Committee on Agriculture and Agri-Food.

He did not run for reelection in the 2021 Canadian federal election.

Electoral record

References

External links
 Official Website

1955 births
Living people
Businesspeople from New Brunswick
Members of the House of Commons of Canada from New Brunswick
Liberal Party of Canada MPs
Canadian farmers
21st-century Canadian politicians